Anolis gonavensis, the Gonave twig anole, is a species of lizard in the family Dactyloidae. The species is found in Haiti.

References

Anoles
Endemic fauna of Haiti
Reptiles of Haiti
Reptiles described in 2016
Taxa named by Gunther Köhler
Taxa named by Stephen Blair Hedges